The ND Ilhéu da Mina is a dredger and freighter operated by Açores Madeira that operates in the archipelago of the Azores.

History 

The ship was launched on 20 December 1976 by the Dutch shipyards of Buijs Scheepsbouw, Krimpen aan den IJssel, and baptized Riosal.

It was sold various times throughout its history; on 20 January 1983 it was renamed River Herald, on 31 March 1988, Espero I, on 21 June 1989, Sandettie, on 19 March 1993, Sirenitas and on 24 January 2002, Ilheu Damina.

On 16 August 2004 it was rechristened the Ilhéu da Mina, after it was acquired by the maritime operator Açores Madeira - Sociedade de Extração e Comercialização de Areia dos Açores, Lda. It frequently operates in the service for the Secretaria Regional do Ambiente e do Mar (Regional Secretariat for Environment and Sea), transporting sand among the islands.

References

Sources
 

Transport in the Azores
Dredgers
Cargo ships
1976 ships
Ships built in the Netherlands
Ships of Portugal